Marco Trungelliti was the defending champion but chose not to defend his title.

Gianluca Mager won the title after Nikola Milojević retired at 7–6(9–7), 5–7, 3–2 in the final.

Seeds
All seeds receive a bye into the second round.

Draw

Finals

Top half

Section 1

Section 2

Bottom half

Section 3

Section 4

References

External links
Main draw
Qualifying draw

Open Città della Disfida - Singles
2019 Singles